Nelphe is a genus of tiger moths in the family Erebidae. The genus was erected by Gottlieb August Wilhelm Herrich-Schäffer in 1858.

Species 
Nelphe carolina (H. Edwards, 1886) – Little Carol's wasp moth
Nelphe relegatum (Schaus, 1911)

References

Euchromiina
Moth genera